Sava is a male personal name in South Slavic languages. Perhaps the most famous example is the Serbian medieval prince turned monk Saint Sava. In Croatia, Sava is found as a male name among the Serbs and also as a female name among the Croats, likewise in Bosnia and Herzegovina, a result of the tradition of naming female children after rivers – in this case, after the river Sava. It is also used in Romanian, where it is also a surname.

Given name
 Saint Sava, Serbian saint
 Sava II Petrović-Njegoš, Montenegrin monarch
 Sava Antić, Yugoslav footballer
 Sava Athanasiu, Romanian geologist and paleontologist
 Sava Babić, Serbian writer
 Sava Bjelanović, Serbian politician
 Sava Caracaș, Romanian army general
 Sava Dobroplodni, Bulgarian writer
 Sava Dumitrescu, Romanian pharmacologist
 Sava Grujić, Serbian soldier, statesman and diplomat
 Sava Grozdev, Bulgarian mathematician
 Sava Henția, Romanian painter
 Sava Kovačević, Yugoslav partisan
 Sava Mrkalj, Serbian linguist
 Sava Mutkurov, Bulgarian officer and politician
 Sava Ranđelović, Serbian water polo player, Olympic champion
 Sava Savanović, alleged vampire
 Sava Šumanović, Serbian painter
 Sava Tekelija, Serbian philanthropist
 Sava Vladislavich, Serbian merchant-adventurer in Russian service

Surname
 Andrei Sava, Romanian footballer 
 Constantin Sava, best known as DJ Sava, Romanian DJ and record producer
 Facundo Sava, Argentinian footballer
 Gabriel Sava, Romanian footballer 
 Marius Sava, Romanian footballer 
 Teodora Sava, Romanian singer

See also
 Savva (given name)
 Saba (given name), Georgian cognate
 Sabbas
 Savo (given name)

References

Slavic masculine given names
Montenegrin masculine given names
Serbian masculine given names
Bosnian masculine given names
Bosnian feminine given names
Bulgarian masculine given names
Romanian masculine given names
Romanian-language surnames